Granulosis rubra nasi is a rare familial disease of children, occurring on the nose, cheeks, and chin, characterized by diffuse redness, persistent excessive sweating, and small dark red papules that disappear on diascopic pressure.

See also
Skin lesion
List of cutaneous conditions

References

External links 

 

Conditions of the skin appendages